Paramevania is a genus of moths in the subfamily Arctiinae. It contains the single species Paramevania inconspicua, which is found in tropical America.

References

Arctiinae